Indiana Jones and the Temple of Doom is a 1984 American action-adventure film directed by Steven Spielberg. It is the second installment in the Indiana Jones franchise, and a prequel to the 1981 film Raiders of the Lost Ark, featuring Harrison Ford who reprises his role as the title character. Kate Capshaw, Amrish Puri, Roshan Seth, Philip Stone, and Ke Huy Quan star in supporting roles. In the film, after arriving in India, Indiana Jones is asked by desperate villagers to find a mystical stone and rescue their children from a Thuggee cult practicing child slavery, black magic, and ritual human sacrifice in honor of the goddess Kali.

Not wishing to feature the Nazis as the villains again, executive producer and story writer George Lucas decided to regard this film as a prequel. Three plot devices were rejected before Lucas wrote a film treatment that resembled the final storyline. As Lawrence Kasdan, Lucas's collaborator on Raiders of the Lost Ark, turned down the offer to write the script, Willard Huyck and Gloria Katz, who had previously worked with Lucas on American Graffiti (1973), were hired as his replacements.

Indiana Jones and the Temple of Doom was released on May 23, 1984, to financial success but initial reviews were mixed, criticizing its darker elements, strong violence and gore, as well as Capshaw's performance as Willie Scott; however, critical opinion has improved since 1984, citing the film's intensity and imagination. In response to some of the more violent sequences in the film, and with similar complaints about Gremlins, Spielberg suggested that the Motion Picture Association of America (MPAA) alter its rating system, which it did within two months of the film's release, creating a new PG-13 rating. It was nominated for the Academy Award for Best Original Score and won the Academy Award for Best Visual Effects. A sequel, Indiana Jones and the Last Crusade, followed in 1989.

Plot

In 1935, Indiana Jones survives a murder attempt by Lao Che, a crime boss and businessman in Shanghai who has hired him to retrieve the remains of Emperor Nurhaci. With his young orphaned Chinese sidekick Short Round and the nightclub singer Willie Scott in tow, Indy flees Shanghai on a cargo aircraft (a Ford Trimotor), unaware that the plane is owned by Lao Che. While the three of them are asleep, the pilots dump the fuel and escape using a parachute, leaving the plane to crash over the Himalayas. The three narrowly manage to survive by jumping out of the plane on an inflatable raft.

They ride down the mountain slopes and fall into a raging river, eventually arriving at the village of Mayapore in northern India. The villagers plead for their aid in retrieving the sacred stone (shivalinga) stolen from their shrine, along with their missing children, by evil forces in the nearby Pankot Palace. Indy agrees to do so, hypothesizing that the stone is one of the five Sankara stones given by the gods to help humanity fight evil.

The trio receive a warm welcome at Pankot Palace and are allowed to stay for the night as guests, attending a lavish, but revolting, banquet hosted by the young Maharajah. The officials rebuff Indy's theory that the Thuggee cult is responsible for their troubles. Later that night, Indy is attacked by an assassin. After Indy kills him, he discovers a series of tunnels hidden behind a statue and sets out to explore them, overcoming a series of booby traps.

The trio reach an underground sector where the Thuggees worship Kali with human sacrifice. They discover that the Thuggees now possess three of the Sankara stones and have enslaved the children to search for the last two, hidden in the palace catacombs. As Indy tries to retrieve the stones, he, Willie, and Shorty are captured. Thuggee high priest Mola Ram forces Indy to drink a potion that puts him into a trance-like state in which he mindlessly serves the cult. Willie is prepared for sacrifice, while Shorty is put to work in the mines with the other children. Shorty escapes and returns to the temple, where he first frees Indy and, later, the Maharajah from the effects of the potion by burning them with a torch. Indy saves Willie and retrieves the stones. After freeing the children, Indy battles a hulking overseer, who dies when he is pulled into a rock crusher.

The trio escape from the temple in a railroad cart through the mines, pursued by Thuggees, and barely escape Mola Ram's attempt to flood them out. They are again ambushed by Mola Ram and his henchmen on a rope bridge above a crocodile-infested river. Indy cuts the bridge, causing several of the henchmen to fall for prey to the crocodiles and leaving the survivors to hang on for their lives. As Mola Ram and Indy struggle, Indy invokes the name of Shiva, causing the stones to glow red-hot and burn through Indy's satchel. Two of them fall out; Mola Ram tries to catch the third, but burns his hand and falls from the bridge and into the river, where he, too, is devoured by the crocodiles. Indy catches the stone safely and climbs up just as a company of British Indian Army riflemen, sent by the Maharajah, arrive and open fire against the Thuggees to drive them away; the surviving Thuggees are soon cornered and arrested by more soldiers. Indy, Willie, and Shorty return the stone to Mayapore and reunite the missing children with the villagers.

Cast

 Harrison Ford as Indiana Jones: An archaeologist adventurer who is asked by a desperate Indian village to retrieve a mysterious stone and rescue the missing village children. Ford undertook a strict physical exercise regimen headed by Jake Steinfeld to gain a more muscular tone for the part.
 Kate Capshaw as Willie Scott: An American nightclub singer working in Shanghai. In a nod to the Star Wars franchise, the nightclub is called Club Obi Wan. Willie is unprepared for her adventure with Indy and Short Round, and appears to be a damsel in distress. She also forms a romantic relationship with Indy. Over 120 actresses auditioned for the role, including Sharon Stone. To prepare for the role, Capshaw watched The African Queen and A Guy Named Joe. Spielberg wanted Willie to be a complete contrast to Marion Ravenwood from Raiders of the Lost Ark, so Capshaw dyed her brown hair blonde for the part. Costume designer Anthony Powell wanted the character to have red hair.
 Ke Huy Quan as Short Round: Indy's 11-year-old Chinese sidekick, who drives the 1936 Auburn Boat Tail Speedster that allows Indy to escape during the opening sequence. Quan was chosen as part of a casting call in Los Angeles. Around 6,000 actors auditioned worldwide for the part, including Peter Shinkoda; Quan was cast after his brother auditioned for the role. Spielberg liked his personality, so he and Ford improvised the scene where Short Round accuses Indy of cheating during a card game.
 Amrish Puri as Mola Ram: A Thuggee priest who performs rites of human sacrifices. The character is named after an 18th-century Indian painter. Lucas wanted Mola Ram to be terrifying, so the screenwriters added elements of Aztec and Hawaiian human sacrificers and European devil worship to the character. To create his headdress, make-up artist Tom Smith based the skull on a cow (as this would be sacrilegious), and used a latex shrunken head.
 Roshan Seth as Chattar Lal: The Prime Minister of the Maharaja of Pankot. Chattar, also a Thuggee worshipper, is enchanted by Indy, Willie and Short Round's arrival, but is offended by Indy's questioning of the palace's history and the archaeologist's own dubious past.
 Philip Stone as Captain Philip Blumburtt: A British Indian Army Captain on a routine inspection tour of Pankot and the surrounding area. Alongside a unit of his riflemen, Blumburtt assists Indy towards the end in fighting off Thuggee reinforcements.

Additionally, Roy Chiao portrays Lao Che, a Shanghai crime boss who, with his sons Chen (Chua Kah Joo) and Kao Kan (Ric Young), hires Indy to recover the cremated ashes of one of his ancestors; Ron Taylor dubbed Chiao's voice. David Yip portrays Wu Han, a friend of Indy, who is killed in Club Obi Wan. Raj Singh (dubbed by Katie Leigh) portrays Zalim Singh, the adolescent Maharajá of Pankot, and D. R. Nanayakkara portrays Shaman, the leader of a small village that recruits Indy to retrieve their stolen sacred Shiva lingam stone.  An uncredited Dan Aykroyd appears briefly and with a British accent as Weber, who escorts Jones, Short Round and Willie from their car to the plane.

Actor Pat Roach plays the Thuggee overseer in the mines, with painted brown skin; Roach had previously appeared as a German mechanic and the Giant Sherpa in Raiders of the Lost Ark. Spielberg, Lucas, Marshall, Kennedy, and Dan Aykroyd have cameos at the airport. Tress MacNeille dubbed the voice of the first slave child in the prison scene.

Production

Development
Spielberg later recalled that when Lucas first approached him for Raiders of the Lost Ark, "George said if I directed the first one then I would have to direct a trilogy. He had three stories in mind. It turned out George did not have three stories in mind and we had to make up subsequent stories." Both men later attributed the film's tone, which was darker than Raiders of the Lost Ark, to their personal moods following the breakups of their relationships. In addition, Lucas felt "it had to have been a dark film. The way Empire Strikes Back was the dark second act of the Star Wars trilogy." Spielberg had said "The danger in making a sequel is that you can never satisfy everyone. If you give people the same movie with different scenes, they say why weren't you more original?" "But if you give them the same character in another fantastic adventure, but with a different tone, you risk disappointing the other half of the audience who just wanted a carbon copy of the first film with a different girl and a different bad guy. So you win and you lose both ways."

Lucas set the film in an earlier year than the first to avoid repeating the use of Nazis as the villains. Spielberg originally wanted to bring Marion Ravenwood back, with Abner Ravenwood considered as a possible character. In developing the story, Lucas conceived of an opening chase scene with Indiana Jones on a motorcycle on the Great Wall of China, followed by the discovery of a "Lost World pastiche with a hidden valley inhabited by dinosaurs". Another idea was to feature the Monkey King as the plot device. However, Chinese authorities refused permission for them to film in the country, requiring a different setting. Lucas wrote a film treatment that included a haunted castle in Scotland, but Spielberg felt it was too similar to Poltergeist; so the setting transformed into a demonic temple in India.

Lucas came up with ideas that involved a religious cult devoted to child slavery, black magic, and ritual human sacrifice. Lawrence Kasdan of Raiders of the Lost Ark was asked to write the script. "I didn't want to be associated with Temple of Doom," he reflected. "I just thought it was horrible. It's so mean. There's nothing pleasant about it. I think Temple of Doom represents a chaotic period in both their [Lucas's and Spielberg's] lives, and the movie is very ugly and mean-spirited." Lucas hired Willard Huyck and Gloria Katz to write the script because of their knowledge of Indian culture. Gunga Din served as an influence for the film.

Huyck and Katz spent four days at Skywalker Ranch for story discussions with Lucas and Spielberg in early 1982. They later said the early plot consisted of two notions of Lucas': that Indy would recover something stolen from a village and decide whether to give it back, and that the picture would start in China and work its way to India. Huyck says Lucas was very single-minded about getting through meetings, while "Steve would always stop and think about visual stuff."

Lucas's initial idea for Indiana's sidekick was a virginal young princess, but Huyck, Katz, and Spielberg disliked the idea. Just as Indiana Jones was named after Lucas's Alaskan Malamute, the character of Willie was named after Spielberg's Cocker Spaniel, and Short Round was named after Huyck's dog, whose name was derived from The Steel Helmet.

Lucas handed Huyck and Katz a 20-page treatment in May 1982 titled Indiana Jones and the Temple of Death to adapt into a screenplay. Scenes such as the fight scene in Shanghai, the escape from the airplane, and the mine cart chase came from earlier scripts of Raiders of the Lost Ark. In Raiders, the headpiece for the Staff of Ra was originally conceived to be in two pieces, with the first piece in the museum of General Hok, a Japanese-allied Chinese warlord in Shanghai. Jones was planned to steal that piece, and then use a giant gong as a shield as General Hok fired a submachine gun at him during his escape, much like the final moments in Club Obi-Wan. Kasdan said that was too expensive to produce for the earlier movie. After that, Jones was to fly to Nepal to find Marion and the second piece. In flight, he fell asleep and all of the other passengers on the plane bailed out and parachuted to safety, leaving him to escape alone using an inflatable raft to slide down a Himalayan slope to Marion's bar. Kasdan said this was cut because it interrupted the story flow and was "too unbelievable," a complaint leveled by some critics at the finished scene.

Lucas, Huyck, and Katz had been developing Radioland Murders (1994) since the early 1970s. The opening music was taken from that script and applied to Temple of Doom. Spielberg reflected, "George's idea was to start the movie with a musical number. He wanted to do a Busby Berkeley dance number. At all our story meetings he would say, 'Hey, Steven, you always said you wanted to shoot musicals.' I thought, 'Yeah, that could be fun.

Lucas, Spielberg, Katz, and Huyck were concerned how to keep the audience interest while explaining the Thuggee cult. Huyck and Katz proposed a tiger hunt but Spielberg said, "There's no way I'm going to stay in India long enough to shoot a tiger hunt." They eventually decided on a dinner scene involving eating bugs, monkey brains, and the like. "Steve and George both still react like children, so their idea was to make it as gross as possible," says Katz.

Lucas sent Huyck and Katz a 500-page transcript of their taped conversations to help them with the script. The first draft was written in six weeks, in early August 1982. "Steve was coming off an enormously successful movie [E.T.] and George didn't want to lose him," said Katz. "He desperately wanted him to direct (Temple of Doom). We were under a lot of pressure to do it really, really fast so we could hold on to Steve."

A second draft was finished by September. Captain Blumburtt, Chattar Lal, and the boy Maharaja originally had more crucial roles. A dogfight scene was deleted, as well as scenes where those who drank the Kali blood turned into zombies with physical superhuman abilities. During pre-production, the Temple of Death title was replaced with Temple of Doom. From March to April 1983, Huyck and Katz simultaneously performed rewrites for a final shooting script.

Huyck and Katz later said Harrison Ford took many of the one liners originally given to Short Round.

Filming

The filmmakers were denied permission to film in North India and Amer Fort, due to the government finding the script offensive. Producer Frank Marshall explained that "originally the scenes were going to be shot in India at a fantastic palace. They required us to give them a script, so we sent it over and we didn't think it was going to be a problem. But because of the voodoo element with Mola Ram and the Thuggees, the Indian government was a little bit hesitant to give us permission. They wanted us to do things like not use the term Maharajah, and they didn't want us to shoot in a particular temple that we had picked. The Indian government wanted changes to the script and final cut privilege."

As a result, location work went to Kandy, Sri Lanka, with matte paintings and scale models applied for the village, temple, and Pankot Palace. Budgetary inflation also caused Temple of Doom to cost $28.17 million, $8 million more than Raiders of the Lost Ark. Filming began on April 18, 1983, in Kandy, and moved to Elstree Studios in Hertfordshire, England on May 5. Marshall recalled, "when filming the bug scenes, crew members would go home and find bugs in their hair, clothes and shoes." Eight out of the nine sound stages at Elstree housed the filming of Temple of Doom. Lucas biographer Marcus Hearn observed, "Douglas Slocombe's skillful lighting helped disguise the fact that about 80 percent of the film was shot with sound stages."

Danny Daniels choreographed the opening music number "Anything Goes". Capshaw learned to sing in Mandarin and took tap dance lessons. However the dress was fitted so tightly that Capshaw was not able to dance in it. Made by Barbara Matera out of original 1920s and 1930s beads, the dress was one of a kind. The opening dance number was actually the last scene to be shot, but the dress did feature in some earlier location shots in Sri Lanka, drying on a nearby tree. Unfortunately an elephant had started to eat it, tearing the whole back of the dress. Consequently, some emergency repair work had to be done by Matera with what remained of the original beads, and it was costume designer Anthony Powell who had to fill in the insurance forms. As to the reason for damage, he had no option but to put "dress eaten by elephant".

In a 2003 documentary on the making of the film (first released when the original trilogy made its debut on DVD), costume designer Anthony Powell stated that only one evening dress was made for Capshaw due to the limited amount of original 1920s and 1930s beads and sequins (story above). However, there have been more than one of Capshaw's evening dresses on display at the same time in different countries during exhibitions – from late 2014, a dress was on display at the Hollywood Costume exhibition in Los Angeles (exhibition ran from October 2, 2014 – March 2, 2015). At the very same time, the travelling "Indiana Jones: Adventure of Archaeology" exhibition was on display in Edmonton in Canada (October 11, 2014 – April 6, 2015) and there featured another of the red and gold dresses.

Production designer Norman Reynolds could not return for Temple of Doom because of his commitment to Return to Oz. Elliot Scott (Labyrinth, Who Framed Roger Rabbit), Reynolds' mentor, was hired. To build the rope bridge the filmmakers found a group of British engineers from Balfour Beatty working on the nearby Victoria Dam. Harrison Ford suffered a severe spinal disc herniation by performing a somersault while filming the scene with the assassin in Jones's bedroom. A hospital bed was brought on set for Ford to rest between takes. Lucas stated, "He could barely stand up, yet he was there every day so shooting would not stop. He was in incomprehensible pain, but he was still trying to make it happen." With no alternatives, Lucas shut down production while Ford was flown to Centinela Hospital on June 21 for recovery. Stunt double Vic Armstrong spent five weeks as a stand-in for various shots. Wendy Leech, Armstrong's wife, served as Capshaw's stunt double.

Macau (then a Portuguese colony) was substituted for Shanghai, while cinematographer Douglas Slocombe caught fever from June 24 to July 7 and could not work. Ford returned on August 8. Despite the problems during filming, Spielberg was able to complete Temple of Doom on schedule and on budget, finishing principal photography on August 26. Various pickups took place afterwards. This included Snake River Canyon, in Idaho, Mammoth Mountain, Tuolumne and American River, Yosemite National Park, San Joaquin Valley, Hamilton Air Force Base and Arizona. Producer Frank Marshall directed a second unit in Florida in January 1984, using alligators to double as crocodiles. The mine chase was a combination of a roller coaster and scale models with dolls doubling for the actors. Minor stop motion was also used for the sequence. Visual effects supervisors Dennis Muren, Joe Johnston and a crew at Industrial Light & Magic provided the visual effects work, while Skywalker Sound, headed by Ben Burtt, commissioned the sound design. Burtt recorded roller coasters at Disneyland Park in Anaheim for the mine cart scene.

Editing
"After I showed the film to George [Lucas], at an hour and 55 minutes, we looked at each other," Spielberg remembered. "The first thing that we said was, 'Too fast'. We needed to decelerate the action. I did a few more matte shots to slow it down. We made it a little bit slower, by putting breathing room back in so there'd be a two-hour oxygen supply for the audience."

Music

Release

Box office
Temple of Doom was released on May 23, 1984, in America, accumulating a record-breaking $45.7 million in its first week. The film went on to gross $333.1 million worldwide, with $180 million in North America and $153.1 million in other markets. The film had the highest opening weekend of 1984, and was that year's highest-grossing film (third in North America, behind Beverly Hills Cop and Ghostbusters). It was also the tenth highest-grossing film of all time during its release. It sold an estimated 53,532,800 tickets in the United States.

Promotion
Marvel Comics published a comic book adaptation of the film by writer David Michelinie and artists Jackson Guice, Ian Akin, Brian Garvey, and Bob Camp. It was published as Marvel Super Special #30 and as a three-issue limited series.

LucasArts and Atari Games promoted the film by releasing an arcade game. Hasbro released a toy line based on the film in September 2008.

Home media
The video was released at Christmas 1986 with a retail price of $29.95 and sold a record 1.4 million units. A DVD version of the film was released in 2003 together with the two other films in the then Indiana Jones trilogy series. A Blu-ray version for the film was released in 2012 as part of a box set for the series, which had four films at the time. In 2021, a remastered 4K version of the film was released on Ultra HD Blu-ray, produced using scans of the original negatives. It was released as part of a box set for the then four films in the Indiana Jones film series.

Television 
In Japan, the film was aired on Nippon TV (NTV), on October 16, 1987. It became NTV's most-watched film up until then with a 26.9% audience rating, surpassing the 25.3% record previously set by First Blood in 1985. In turn, Temple of Doom was later surpassed by Tsuribaka Nisshi 4 in 1994, but remained NTV's most-watched foreign film up until Harry Potter and the Philosopher's Stone in 2004.

In the United Kingdom, the film's 2005 airing was watched by  viewers on BBC1, becoming the channel's ninth most-watched film during the first half of 2005.

Reception

Critical response
Indiana Jones and the Temple of Doom received mixed reviews upon its release, but over the years the film's reception has shifted to a more positive tone. The site's critical consensus reads, "It may be too 'dark' for some, but Indiana Jones and the Temple of Doom remains an ingenious adventure spectacle that showcases one of Hollywood's finest filmmaking teams in vintage form." On Metacritic the film has a weighted average score of 57 out of 100, based on 14 critics, indicating "mixed or average reviews".

Roger Ebert gave the film a perfect four-star rating, calling it "the most cheerfully exciting, bizarre, goofy, romantic adventure movie since Raiders, and it is high praise to say that it's not so much a sequel as an equal. It's quite an experience." Vincent Canby felt the film was "too shapeless to be the fun that Raiders is, but shape may be beside the point. Old-time, 15-part movie serials didn't have shape. They just went on and on and on, which is what Temple of Doom does with humor and technical invention." Neal Gabler commented that "I think in some ways, Indiana Jones and the Temple of Doom was better than Raiders of the Lost Ark. In some ways it was less. In sum total, I'd have to say I enjoyed it more. That doesn't mean it's better necessarily, but I got more enjoyment out of it." Colin Covert of the Star Tribune called the film "sillier, darkly violent and a bit dumbed down, but still great fun." Pauline Kael, writing in The New Yorker, said that "nobody has ever fused thrills and laughter in quite the way that [Spielberg] does here" and claimed that the movie was "the most sheerly pleasurable physical comedy I've seen in years."

Dave Kehr stated "The film betrays no human impulse higher than that of a ten-year-old boy trying to gross out his baby sister by dangling a dead worm in her face." Ralph Novak of People complained "The ads that say 'this film may be too intense for younger children' are fraudulent. No parent should allow a young child to see this traumatizing movie; it would be a cinematic form of child abuse. Even Harrison Ford is required to slap Quan and abuse Capshaw. There are no heroes connected with the film, only two villains; their names are Steven Spielberg and George Lucas." The Observer described it as "a thin, arch, graceless affair." The Guardian summarized it as "a two-hour series of none too carefully linked chase sequences ... sitting on the edge of your seat gives you a sore bum but also a numb brain." Leonard Maltin gave the movie only 2 out of 4 stars, saying that the film is "headache inducing" and "never gives us a chance to breathe", and chiding the gross-out' gags."

Colin Greenland reviewed Indiana Jones and the Temple of Doom for Imagine magazine, and stated that "Raiders had the wit and lightness of touch not to take itself too seriously. Temple starts well, but promptly loses itself In clamorous self-importance. I couldn't care less if it outgrosses Raiders. It grossed me out."

The character of Willie Scott has been criticized for her constant screaming and frequent need to be rescued. Kate Capshaw called Willie "not much more than a dumb screaming blonde." Steven Spielberg said in 1989 "I wasn't happy with Temple of Doom at all. It was too dark, too subterranean, and much too horrific. I thought it out-poltered Poltergeist. There's not an ounce of my own personal feeling in Temple of Doom." He later added during the Making of Indiana Jones and the Temple of Doom documentary, "Temple of Doom is my least favorite of the trilogy. I look back and I say, 'Well the greatest thing that I got out of that was I met Kate Capshaw.' We married years later and that to me was the reason I was fated to make Temple of Doom."

Lucas, who had divorced from Marcia Lucas, attributed the film's darkness to his relationship problems, but in regards to the film said, "I love the movie, it's just slightly darker in tone and not as fun as the first."

In 2014, Time Out polled several film critics, directors, actors and stunt actors to list their top action films. Indiana Jones and the Temple of Doom was listed at 71st place on this list.

Awards
Dennis Muren and Industrial Light & Magic's visual effects department won the Academy Award for Best Visual Effects at the 57th Academy Awards. Soundtrack composer John Williams was, as he had been for his work on Raiders of the Lost Ark, again nominated for Original Music Score. The visual effects crew won the same category at the 38th British Academy Film Awards. Cinematographer Douglas Slocombe, editor Michael Kahn, Ben Burtt and other sound designers at Skywalker Sound received nominations. Spielberg, the writers, Harrison Ford, Jonathan Ke Quan, Anthony Powell and makeup designer Tom Smith were nominated for their work at the Saturn Awards. Temple of Doom was nominated for Best Fantasy Film but lost to Ghostbusters.

Controversy 
The depiction of Indian culture caused controversy and brought it to the attention of India's censors, who placed a temporary ban on it as it did not open in theaters. The film was later released when it came out on home video. In India the depiction of Indian cuisine was heavily criticized, as dishes such as baby snakes, eyeball soup, beetles, and chilled monkey brains are not Indian foods. Shashi Tharoor and Yvette Rosser have criticized the film for its portrayal of India, with Rosser writing "[it] seems to have been taken as a valid portrayal of India by many teachers, since a large number of students surveyed complained that teachers referred to the eating of monkey brains." Tharoor criticizes the film for promoting a negative impression of India as "a country where kings and courtiers feasted on stewed snakes and monkey brains, where Kali worshippers plucked the hearts out of their victims and embroiled them in flaming pits, and where evil, poverty and destitution reigned until the Great White Hero could intervene to restore justice and prosperity". Other assessments of the movie, both those contemporaneous to the release of the film, and later reviews, have criticized the depiction of Indian religion and Chinese characters as racist and orientalist, and reflecting white savior tropes.

Roshan Seth, who played Chattar Lal, mentioned that the banquet scene was a joke that went wrong, saying, "Steven intended it as a joke, the joke being that Indians were so smart that they knew all Westerners think that Indians eat cockroaches, so they served them what they expected. The joke was too subtle for that film."

In his autobiography, Amrish Puri expressed the whole controversy around the film was "silly". He wrote that "it's based on an ancient cult that existed in India and was recreated like a fantasy. If you recall those imaginary places like Pankot Palace, starting with Shanghai, where the plane breaks down and the passengers use a raft to jump over it, slide down a hill and reach India, can this ever happen? But fantasies are fantasies, like our Panchatantra and folklore. I know we are sensitive about our cultural identity, but we do this to ourselves in our own films. It's only when some foreign directors do it that we start cribbing."

Influence 
In response to some of the more violent sequences in the film, and with similar complaints about Gremlins, Spielberg suggested that the Motion Picture Association of America (MPAA) alter its rating system by introducing an intermediary between the PG and R ratings. The MPAA concurred, and a new PG-13 rating was introduced two months after the film's release. In the UK, the film was heavily censored for a PG rating. The United Kingdom followed suit five years later, with the BBFC introducing the 12 rating and Batman (1989) being the first film to receive it. Temple of Doom was itself re-rated 12, uncut, in 2012.

Notes

References

Further reading

External links

 
  at 
 
 
 
 
 

Indiana Jones films
1984 films
1980s action adventure films
BAFTA winners (films)
Prequel films
Censored films
Race-related controversies in film
Films shot in India
Films scored by John Williams
Films about Indian slavery
Film controversies
Films directed by Steven Spielberg
Films with screenplays by George Lucas
Films set in 1935
Films set in India
Films set in the British Raj
Films set in Shanghai
Films shot in Arizona
Films shot in California
Films shot in Macau
Films shot in England
Films shot in Florida
Films shot in Sri Lanka
Films shot in Washington (state)
Films that won the Best Visual Effects Academy Award
Hinduism in pop culture-related controversies
Hinduism-related controversies
Films about mining
Films with screenplays by Willard Huyck
Films with screenplays by Gloria Katz
Treasure hunt films
Films shot at EMI-Elstree Studios
Lucasfilm films
Paramount Pictures films
American action adventure films
American adventure thriller films
Films about cults
Films about human sacrifice
Film censorship in India
Film controversies in India
Films about child abduction in India
1980s English-language films
1980s American films
American prequel films